This list of Baptists covers those who were members of Baptist churches or raised in such. It does not imply that all were practicing Baptists or remained so all their lives. As an article of faith, Baptists baptize believers after conversion, not infants.

Abbreviations of countries: Australia (A); Brazil (Br); Burma (Bu); Canada (Ca); China (C); Rep. of Congo (Kinshasa) (CK); Rep. of Congo (Leopoldville) (CL); England (E); India (I); Isle of Man (IoM); Jamaica (J); Japan (Jp); New Zealand (NZ); Puerto Rico (PR); Romania (R); Scotland (S); Sri Lanka, Ceylon (SL); Ukraine (Uk); United States and previous colonies (US)

Athletes
Charles Barkley (born 1963, US), former professional basketball player
Jim Brown (born 1936, US), former fullback for the Cleveland Browns
Roberto Clemente (1934–1972, PR)
Mike Conley, Jr. (born 1987, US), guard for Memphis Grizzlies basketball team
Zach Johnson (born 1976, US), professional golfer, winner of 2007 Masters Tournament
Magic Johnson (born 1959, US), professional basketball player 
Iris Kyle (born 1974, US), 10-time overall Ms. Olympia professional bodybuilder
Ryan Langerhans (born 1980, US), outfielder for Seattle Mariners
William Lockhart (1835–1893, S/E), cricketer and preacher
Joe Louis (1914–1981, US), professional boxer. Holds the record for longest single reign as champion of any boxer in history.  
Dikembe Mutombo (born 1966, CL/US) center for the Houston Rockets
Bradbury Robinson (1884–1949, US), pioneering American football player, physician and conservationist
Tim Tebow (born 1987, US), professional football quarterback, then baseball player
Mike Tyson (born 1966, US), former boxer and heavyweight champion of the world, who later converted to Islam
Reggie White (1961–2004, US), professional football defensive end; member of Pro Football Hall of Fame

Authors and journalists
Nathan Bailey (died 1742, E), philologist and lexicographer
Clara Lucas Balfour (1808–1878, E), writer and temperance campaigner
Ray Bradbury (1920–2012, US), science fiction author, later described himself as Buddhist
Samuel Bagster the Younger (1800–1835, E) writer on religion and beekeeping
Henlee Hulix Barnette (1911–2004, US), writer on Christian ethics
Thomas Spencer Baynes (1823–1887, E), philosopher
Henry Blackaby (living, Ca), writer on knowing God
Frank W. Boreham (1871–1959, E/NZ), daily press contributions on religion
Robbie Branscum (1934–1997, US), writer for children and young adults
Edith Bryan (1872–1963, E/A), educationalist for children with special needs
Tony Campolo (born 1935, US), sociologist and spiritual adviser
Muriel Spurgeon Carder (born 1922, Ca), writer on New Testament studies and pastoral care
Ross Clifford (born 1951, A), theologian and political commentator
Thomas Cooper (1805–1892, E), poet and Chartist
Esther Copley (1786–1851, E), tractarian and writer for children
Thomas Crosby (1683–1751, E), author of History of the English Baptists (1738–1740)
W. E. Cule (1870–1944, W), children's author and editor of Baptist Missionary Society publications
Elizabeth Dawbarn (died 1839, E), religious writer, preacher and pamphleteer
Maria De Fleury (fl. 1773–1791, E), poet, hymnist and polemicist
James T. Draper Jr. (born 1935, US), writer on Christian life
Petru Dugulescu (1945–2008, R), writer on persecution
Daniel C. Eddy (1823–1896, US), hymn writer and advocate of women's education
Gene Edwards (born 1932, US), writer on church history and affairs
Robert Ellis (born 1956, E), theologian
William Roscoe Estep (1920–2000, US), historian
Jerry Falwell Sr. (1933–2007, US), writer on social and political affairs
Paul Fiddes (born 1947, E), theologian and novelist
Sallie Rochester Ford (1828–1910, US), writer and newspaper editor
Harry Emerson Fosdick (1878–1969, US), Modernist theologian
Hans Frei (1922–1988, US), Bible scholar and theologian
Gilberto Freyre (1900–1987, Br), sociologist and anthropologist
Michael Frost (born 1961, A), missional and theologian
Edwin Gaustad (1923–2011, US), scholar and historian of religion
Billy Graham (1918–2018, US), worldwide evangelist
Jack Graham (born 1950), writer on Christian life
John Grisham (born 1955, US), novelist
Ken Ham (born 1951, A/US), fundamentalist and creationist
Roger E. Hedlund (born 1935, US/I), missionary and researcher
Kent Hovind (born 1953, US), fundamentalist and creationist
George Howells (1871–1955, W/I), writer and academic
Mike Huckabee (born 1955, US), politician and writer on social and political affairs
Donald Foster Hudson (1916–2003, E), missionary and educationalist
Robert Don Hughes (born 1949, US), minister, educator and science fiction author
Russell Humphreys (born 1942, US), creationist
Johnny Hunt (born 1952, US), writer on Christian life and biblical studies
William Jones (1762–1846, W/E), writer and bookseller
Adoniram Judson (1788–1850, US/Bu), missionary and producer of a Burmese Bible and a dictionary
Tim LaHaye (1926–2016, US), co-author of the bestselling Left Behind series
Doris Lester (1886–1965, E), religious writer and social worker
Charles Lloyd (1766–1829, W/E), preacher and schoolmaster
Bill Moyers (born 1934, US), television journalist and former White House Press Secretary
David Owen (Dewi Wyn o Eifion) (1784–1841, W), Welsh-language poet
Hazel Brannon Smith (1914–1994, US), journalist and editor; first female recipient of the Pulitzer Prize for Editorial Writing

Criminals
Jesse James (1847–1882, US), outlaw, son of a Baptist minister, Confederate soldier
Harry Longabaugh (1867–1908, US), "The Sundance Kid", train robber and outlaw

Entertainers, movie and television personalities

Clay Aiken (born 1978, US) pop music singer
Roy Acuff (1903–1992, US), country musician
Warren Beatty (born 1937, US), actor
David Bellamy (1933–2019, E), television presenter, botanist, and environmentalist
Lead Belly (1888–1949, US), folk and blues musician
Chuck Berry (1926–2017, US), singer, songwriter and one of the pioneers of rock and roll music (raised a Baptist)
Spencer Bohren (1950–2019, US), American roots musician, raised a Baptist
Glen Campbell (1936–2017, US), country music singer
Mark Carman (born 1960, US), singer, composer, writer and producer
Aaron Carter (1987-2022, US), singer
Nick Carter (born 1980, US), lead vocalist of the Backstreet Boys
Johnny Cash (1932–2003, US), country music singer
Ray Charles (1930–2004, US), musician, singer, and composer
Jerry Clower (1926–1998, US), rural humorist, member of the Grand Ole Opry, lay minister
Kevin Costner (born 1955, US), actor
Jill Dando (1961–1999, E) television presenter (murdered)
Bette Davis (1908–1989, US), actress and erstwhile Baptist
Jamie Foxx (born 1967, US), actor, singer and stand-up comedian
Aretha Franklin (1942–2018, US), singer and daughter of Baptist minister Rev. C.L. Franklin
Ava Gardner (1922–1990, US), actress
Al Green (born 1946, US), singer, songwriter and record producer
Buddy Holly (1936–1959, US), rock 'n' roll singer
Whitney Houston (1963–2012, US), R&B/pop singer and actress
John Hughes (1872–1914, W), composer and marketing manager
John Hughes (1873–1932, W), composer of hymns
Mahalia Jackson (1911–1972, US), gospel singer
B.B. King (1925–2015, US), blues singer
Gladys Knight (born 1944, US), singer, converted to Mormonism
Avril Lavigne (born 1984, Ca), singer-songwriter and actress 
Brian Littrell (born 1975, US), pop singer, member of the Backstreet Boys
Loretta Lynn (1932-2022, US), country music artist
Reba McEntire (born 1955, US), country music artist and actress
Brittany Murphy (1977–2009, US), actress, singer and voice artist; raised Baptist and later became non-denominational Christian
Eddie Murphy (born 1961, US), actor
Chuck Norris (born 1940, US), actor
Grady Nutt (1934–1982, US), Hee Haw regular (1979–1982), Baptist minister
Brad Pitt (born 1963, US), actor, raised Baptist
Dennis Quaid (born 1954, US), actor
Corinne Bailey Rae (born 1979, E), singer and songwriter
Diana Ross (born 1944, US), singer 
Willard Scott (born 1934, US), television weatherman
Ron Shelton (born 1945, US), movie director
Ashlee Simpson (born 1984, US), pop singer
Jessica Simpson (born 1980, US), pop singer and actress
Sinbad (born 1956 as David Adkins, US), actor and comedian
Will Smith (born 1968, US) actor, raised baptist  
Snoop Dogg (born 1971 as Calvin Broadus, US), rapper, raised Baptist
Britney Spears (born 1981, US), pop singer
Irma Thomas (born 1941, US), soul singer
Justin Timberlake (born 1981, US), pop singer
Tina Turner (born 1939, US), singer, converted to Buddhism
Carrie Underwood (born 1983, US), country music singer
Billy Vaughn (1919–1991, US), Big Band orchestra leader, songwriter, and saxophonist
Stevie Wonder (born 1950, US), musician, singer, songwriter, and producer
Oprah Winfrey (born 1954, US), raised Baptist, now a spiritualist
Dan Whitney (Larry the Cable Guy) (born 1963, US), son of a Baptist preacher, attended Baptist University of America

Industrialists and business leaders

George Fife Angas (1789–1879, E/A), businessman and banker prominent in the development of South Australia
Thomas Burberry (1835–1926, E), founder of the Burberry chain of clothing stores
S. Truett Cathy (1921–2014, US), billionaire founder of Chick-fil-A restaurants
John Chapman (1801–1854, E), engineer and writer
Eleanor Coade (1733–1821, E), businesswoman manufacturing statuary
Jeremiah Colman (1777–1851, E), founder of the Colman's Mustard company
Thomas Cook (1808–1892, E), founder of the travel agency Thomas Cook & Son
Carl Lindner (1919–2011, US), former owner of the Cincinnati Reds
James Cash Penney (1875–1971, US), J. C. Penney department store magnate, son of a Primitive Baptist lay minister
Thomas Ramsay (1858–1934, S), footwear manufacturer and lay preacher
John D. Rockefeller (1839–1937, US), 20th-century oil tycoon

Jurists
Clement Bailhache (1856–1924, E), commercial lawyer and judge
Hugo Black (1886–1971, US), Supreme Court associate justice
Charles Evans Hughes (1862–1948, US), Supreme Court chief justice
Howell Edmunds Jackson (1832–1935, US), Supreme Court associate justice
Robert Lush (1807–1881, E), judge and Privy Councillor
Roy Moore (born 1947, US), Alabama State Supreme Court chief justice and Republican politician
Clarence Thomas (born 1948, US), Supreme Court associate justice (converted to Catholicism)

Politicians

Daniel Axtell (1622–1660, E), officer in the New Model Army, later executed as a regicide
Richard M. Johnson (1780–1850, US), 9th Vice President of the United States (1837–41)
George Goodman (1791–1859, E), Liberal Mayor of Leeds and MP
Abraham Lincoln (1809–1865, US), 16th President of the United States, raised a Baptist.
Reuben Barrow (1838–1918, E), Liberal politician and member of Parliament
Warren G. Harding (1865–1923, US), 29th President of the United States
Ernest Bevin (1881–1951, E), Labour politician and trade union leader
Ichirō Hatoyama (1883–1959, Jp) 35th Prime Minister of Japan 
Harry Truman (1884–1972, US), 33rd President of the United States
A. V. Alexander, 1st Earl Alexander of Hillsborough (1885–1965, E) Labour-Conservative politician and Minister of Defence
Cyril Black (1902–1991, E), Conservative politician, member of Parliament, and businessman
Nelson Rockefeller (1908–1979, US), 41st Vice President of the United States (1974–1977)
James Callaghan (1912–2005, E), British Prime Minister (1976–1979, E) and leader of the Labour Party (1976–1980)
Audrey Callaghan (1915–2005, E), Labour Party councilor and wife of Prime Minister James Callaghan
Jimmy Carter (born 1924, US), 39th President of the United States
Bill Clinton (born 1946, US), 42nd President of the United States
Chuck Colson (1931–2012, US), senior aide to President Richard Nixon
Yukio Hatoyama (born 1947, Jp), 60th Prime Minister of Japan
Al Gore (born 1948, US), 45th Vice President of the United States
Kamala Harris (born 1964, US), 49th Vice President of the United States
Mike Huckabee (born 1955, US), former governor of Arkansas (R) and 2008 Presidential candidate
Jesse Jackson (born 1941, US), American civil rights activist and Baptist minister; candidate for Democratic presidential nomination in 1984 and 1988; shadow senator for District of Columbia from 1991 to 1997
Norman Kember (born 1931, US), biophysics professor and pacifist
Muriel Lester (1883–1968, E), social activist and pacifist
Elizabeth Lilburne (fl. 1641–1660, E), Leveller
Edmund Ludlow (c. 1617–1692, E), parliamentarian and regicide
John McCain (1936–2018, US), Senator (R) Arizona, presidential candidate
George Hay Morgan (1866–1931, W/E), Liberal UK politician
Ron Paul (born 1935, US), Congressman (R) and former Libertarian Party presidential candidate; known for his libertarian leanings
Wynne Samuel (1912–1989, W), politician
Alfred Thomas, 1st Baron Pontypridd (1840–1927, W), Welsh Liberal politician
Oleksandr Turchynov (Олександр Валентинович Турчинов, born 1964, Uk), interim President of Ukraine since 23 February 2014

Preachers and theologians

Ralph Abernathy (1926–1990, US), pastor and civil rights activist
William Adam (1796–1881, S/I), missionary
John Allen (c. 1741/1742–1780s, E/US), preacher and radical
Steven Anderson (born 1981), preacher
Joseph Angus (1816–1902, E), preacher and biblical scholar
Annie Armstrong (1850–1938, US), missionary organizer; the SBC's Easter mission offering is collected in her honor
Melbourn Aubrey (1885–1957, W/E), minister, ecumenist, and General Secretary of the Baptist Union of Great Britain and Ireland
Charles C. Baldwin (born 1947, US), Chief of Chaplains of the U.S. Air Force, 2004–2008
Jeremy Balfour (born 1967, S), preacher and politician
Alistair Begg (born 1952, S/US), preacher
Francis Bellamy (1855–1931, US), minister and author of the Pledge of Allegiance
Margaret Bevan (c. 1894 – post-1940s, W/US), evangelist and singer
John Birch (1918–1945, US), missionary to China and anti-communist
James Black (1797–1886, S/Ca), preacher and evangelist
Abraham Booth (1734–1806, E), preacher and religious writer
David Bowen (1774–1853, W), preacher
Samuel Breeze (1772–1812, W), preacher and schoolteacher
Hugh Stowell Brown (1823–1886, IoM), preacher and activist
Charles Bulkley (1719–1797, E), preacher
John Bunyan (1628–1688, E), preacher and writer: The Pilgrim's Progress
Thomas Burchell (1799–1846, J), missionary
John G. Burkhalter (1909–1992, US), U.S. Army Chaplain in World War II and Korean War
Dawson Burns (1828–1909, E), preacher and temperance campaigner
Matthew Caffyn (1628–1714, E), preacher and writer
Tony Campolo (born 1935, US), pastor and professor of sociology
William Carey (1761–1834, India), missionary
Benajah Harvey Carroll (1843–1914, US), pastor, theologian, founding president of Southwestern Baptist Theological Seminary
J. M. Carroll (1852–1931, US), pastor and author of The Trail of Blood
Charles Henry Carter (1828–1914, SL), missionary and translator of Old Testament, Book of Psalms, and New Testament into Sinhalese;
Douglas Carver (born 1951, US), Major General who served as Chief of Chaplains of the United States Army
Oswald Chambers (1874–1917, S), pastor and author of My Utmost for His Highest, son of a converted pastor
Oren B. Cheney (1816–1903, US), abolitionist and founder of Bates College
John T. Christian (1854–1925), US, church historian
Dr. John Clarke (1609–1676, US), medical doctor, early proponent of separation of church and state
Walter Thomas Conner (1877–1952, US), Professor of Theology at Southwestern Baptist Theological Seminary
Elijah Craig (1738–1808), preacher, educator and entrepreneur, purported inventor of bourbon whiskey
W. A. Criswell (1909–2002, US), pastor, President of the Southern Baptist Convention, founder of Criswell College
David Crosley (1670–1744, E), evangelist and pastor
Henry Danvers, (died 1687, E), preacher and radical
Charles Davies (1849–1927, W), preacher
David Davies (1794–1856, W), preacher and college principal
David Christopher Davies (1878–1958, W/CK), missionary in Congo
Gwilym Davies (1879–1955, W), preacher and peace activist
Henry Davies (1753–1825, W), preacher
Jacob Davies (1816–1849, W/SL), preacher and missionary
Owen Davies (1840–1929, W), preacher and college lecturer
George Dawson (1821–1876, E), preacher and lecturer
Miguel A. De La Torre (born 1958, US), prolific author on Hispanic religiosity
Henry Denne (c. 1606–1660, E), preacher and controversialist
Morgan Edwards (1722–1792, W/US), preacher and religious historian
Benjamin Evans (1844–1900, W), preacher and local politician
Christmas Evans (1766–1838, W), preacher
John Evans (1767–1827, W), preacher
Jerry Falwell (1933–2007, US), televangelist, founder of the Moral Majority
Enoch Francis (1688–1740, W), preacher and religious writer
John Gano (1727–1804, US), founding pastor of the First Baptist Church in the City of New York, chaplain in the Continental Army, and alleged baptizer of General George Washington
John Gill (1697–1771, US), pastor and theologian
Benjamin Godwin (1785–1881, E), abolitionist leader in Bradford
George Gould (1818–1882, E), preacher in Norwich
Billy Graham (1918–2018, US), evangelist
Peter Grant (1783–1867, S), preacher
George Grenfell (1849–1906, E), missionary and explorer
John Griffith (c. 1622–1700, E), preacher, founder of a London congregation
James Griffiths (1856–1943, W), preacher and President of the Baptist Union of Wales
W. J. Gruffydd (1916–2011, W), preacher and poet
Robert Hall (1728–1791, E), preacher and theologian
Robert Hall (1764–1831, E), preacher and theologian
Mordecai Ham (1877–1961, US), tent revivalist who preached the sermon that converted Billy Graham
John Harper (1872–1912, S/E), preacher
John Harris (c. 1725–1801, E), preacher and controversialist
Joseph Harris (1773–1825, W), preacher, poet and editor
Obadiah Holmes (1610–1682, US), New England Baptist minister whipped in Boston for his beliefs; pastor at Newport, Rhode Island
Kent Hovind (1953–), preacher, evangelist
Thomas Humphreys (died 1909, W), preacher and local councillor
Johnny Hunt (born 1952, US), author and once President of the Southern Baptist Convention
Curtis Hutson (1934–1995), preacher, baptist newspaper editor
Jack Hyles (1926–2001, US), pastor and prominent identity in the Independent Baptist movement
Joseph Ivimey (1773–1834, E), preacher and religious historian
David Bevan Jones (1807–1863, W), preacher and controversialist
Clarence Jordan (1912–1969, US), pastor and author of The Cotton Patch Gospel
William Kiffin (1616–1701, E), London minister, politician and wool merchant
Grantham Killingworth (1699–1778, E), controversialist
Isaac Kimber (1692–1955, E), preacher and biographer
Martin Luther King Sr. (1899–1984, US), pastor, missionary, an early figure in the civil rights movement
Martin Luther King Jr. (1929–1968, US), martyred civil rights leader, Nobel Peace Prize recipient
Kenneth Scott Latourette (1884–1968, US/C), pastor; missionary and church historian
Titus Lewis (1773–1811, W), preacher and lexicographer
John F. MacArthur (born 1939, US), pastor and theologian
Andrew MacBeath (20th century, S), preacher and writer
John MacBeath (1880–1967, S/E), preacher
Hugh Martin (1890–1964, S/E), preacher and publisher
Benjamin Meredith (1700–1749, W), preacher
Charlotte ("Lottie") Diggers Moon (1840–1912, US/C), missionary; the SBC's Christmas missionary offering is named in her honor.
Abel Morgan (1673–1722, W), minister and religious writer
David Eirwyn Morgan (1918–1982, W), minister, college tutor and politician
William Morris (1843–1922, W) minister and President of the Baptist Union of Wales
J. Frank Norris (1877–1952, US), preacher and Christian fundamentalist
Ernest Alexander Payne (1902–1980, E), religious writer and General Secretary of the Baptist Union of Great Britain
Fred Phelps (1929–2014, US), minister opposed to funerals of homosexuals and servicemen
John Piper (born 1946, US), preacher at Bethlehem Baptist Church in Minneapolis; head of Desiring God
Thomas Price (1820–1888, W), preacher and politician
R Guy Ramsay (1895–1976, S), preacher and religious writer
Morgan John Rhys (1760–1804, W/US), preacher and politician
John R. Rice (1895–1980), preacher, baptist newspaper editor
William Richards (1749–1818, W/E), preacher and lexicographer
Adrian Rogers (1931–2005, US), televangelist
Lester Roloff (1914–1982), preacher, educator
Peter Ruckman (1921–2016), preacher, author
David Syme Russell (1916–2010, S/E), theologian and General Secretary of the Baptist Union of Great Britain
Frances Shimer (1826–1901, US), founder of Shimer College
John Smyth (c. 1554–1612, E), founding pastor of first English-speaking Baptist church
C. H. Spurgeon (1834–1892, E), pastor known as "The Prince of Preachers"
Charles Stanley (born 1932, US), televangelist founder of In Touch Ministries
Jeff Struecker (born 1969, US), pastor, author and former U.S. Army Ranger Chaplain
Joshua Thomas (1719–1797, W), preacher and religious historian
Conrad Tillard, politician, Baptist minister, radio host, author, and activist
Neiliezhü Üsou (1941–2009, I), theologian, church musician, music teacher and composer from the Nagaland, North-East India
Lewis Valentine (1893–1986, W), preacher, politician and author
Paul Washer (born 1961, US), founder of HeartCry Missionary Society
Sidney Abram Weltmer (1858–1930, US), Baptist preacher, professor, magnetic pealer, mental scientist; from Nevada, Missouri; founder of Weltmer Institute for Suggestive Therapeutics and American School of Magnetic Healing.
Rhydwen Williams (1916–1997, W), preacher, poet and novelist
Roger Williams (1603–1683, E/US), founded First Baptist Church in America
Jonathan Woodhouse (born 1955, W), British Army chaplain and preacher
Nigel G. Wright (born 1949, E), theologian, writer and President of the Baptist Union of Great Britain (2002–2013)

Others
Larry Birkhead (born 1973, US), father of Anna Nicole Smith's daughter, Dannielynn Hope Marshall Birkhead
Brian Bluhm (1982–2007, US), one of the students killed in the Virginia Tech massacre and a member of the Baptist Collegiate Ministry
Martha Gurney (1733–1816, E), printer, bookseller and abolitionist
Henry Havelock (1795–1857, E), British army general in India
Paul Hobson (died 1666, E), New Model Army soldier in the English Civil War and controversialist
Edith Killgore Kirkpatrick (1918–2014, US), Executive Board member of the Louisiana Baptist Convention
Newton Knight (1829–1922, US), Confederate deserter who led a band of escaped slaves
Malcolm X (1925–1965, US), raised Baptist, but later converted to Islam

Fictional Baptists

Film
Arachnophobia: Coach Beachwood, his wife, daughter (Becky) and son (Bobby)
The Best Little Whorehouse in Texas: Sheriff Ed Earl Dodd says that he was raised a Baptist.
O Brother, Where Art Thou?: Pete Hogwallop and Delmar O'Donnell are baptized by a Baptist minister.
The Preacher's Wife: Pastor Henry Biggs (Courtney Vance), his wife Julia (Whitney Houston), his mother-in-law Margueritte Coleman (Jenifer Lewis), his son Jeremiah (Justin Pierre Edmund) and many other characters were members of St. Matthew's Baptist Church.

Music
"Preachin Blues" (Son House) contains the lines
Yes, I'm gonna get me religion, I'm gonna join the Baptist Church.
You know I wanna be a Baptist preacher, just so I won't have to work.

"Cowboys Days" (Terri Clark) contains the lines
I was third alto on the second row of the First Baptist church choir
I was keeper of the minutes for the Tri Delts, in charge of the homecoming bonfire
I was a straight 'A', straight laced, level-headed as they come
And parked at the Sonic, isn't that ironic, when my whole world came undone
One slot over was a calf roper giving me his George Strait smile
And before I knew Miss Good-Two-Shoes was two-steppin', runnin' wild.

"Guilty" (The Statler Brothers) contains the lines
If she seems bitter of other ways,
Seems to have lost her Baptist ways,
If the truth comes harder than a lie,
If she's guilty, so am I

"Lonely Lubbock Lights" (Aaron Watson), a singer at the Broken Spoke (a honky-tonk bar) reveals that a love interest is the daughter of a Baptist minister who is keeping them apart (because he sings in bars).
"Southern Baptist Heartbreak" (The Warren Brothers) contains the lines
Somewhere in the middle of "Have Thy Own Way,"
She left an empty pew;
She said 'I think that's what I'll do.'"

"Uneasy Rider" (Charlie Daniels), a hippie is stranded in a bar in the deep South and the locals start making trouble when the fast-thinking hippie accuses one of the locals of being a spy sent to infiltrate the Ku Klux Klan. The local replies that he's a "faithful follower of Brother John Birch and a member of Antioch Baptist Church."

Literature
Fried Green Tomatoes at the Whistle Stop Cafe, by Fannie Flagg
Idgie Threadgood
Rev. Scroggins
The Mitford series by Jan Karon
Sophia Burton, single mother raising two daughters
Absalom Greer, elderly minister and friend of the series'protagonist, Father Tim Kavanagh (Episcopalian rector).
Madelaine Kavanagh, Father Tim's mother
Emma Newland, Father Tim's secretary, raised Baptist, converted to Episcopal, returned to Baptist church on marriage.
Harold Newland, Emma's husband and local postal worker
Rodney Underwood, town's chief of police
Lew Boyd, owner-operator of local Exxon gas station
Mule Skinner, semi-retired realtor
Fancy Skinner, Mule's wife and unisex hairdresser
Bill Sprouse, jovial minister of Mitford's First Baptist Church
To Kill a Mockingbird by Harper Lee
Miss Maudie Atkins, neighbor of Scout Finch, protagonist; more moderate than "Footwashing Baptists" who make a brief appearance
Mr. Radley's father, another of Scout's neighbors
Superman comic book series
Perry White, editor of the Daily Planet

Television
Designing Women, Julia Sugarbaker (Dixie Carter), presumably Suzanne Sugarbaker (Delta Burke) and Charlene Frazier (Jean Smart). Specifically, Charlene reveals that she is a "First Baptist" in the episode "Oh Suzanna". In the episode "How Great Thou Art" Charlene quits her church when she discovers her pastor is opposed to the ordination of women, which was her dream at one time. Mary Jo Shively (Annie Potts) briefly dates Julia's minister.
Sanford And Son, Fred Sanford's (Redd Foxx) former sister-in-law, Aunt Esther (LaWanda Page) is a devout Baptist who often annoys Fred with her constant bible-thumping.
The Jeffersons, George Jefferson (Sherman Hemsley) is revealed to be a Baptist during the third season in "The Christmas Wedding" episode where his son Lionel (Damon Evans) weds Jenny Willis (Berlinda Thomas). The wedding is held up because George wants a Baptist minister to conduct the service while the Willises want a minister of their denomination. Jenny and Lionel quickly marry when a minister (Robert Sampson) (who happens to be Baptist though white, to George's chagrin), is going door-to-door with a group of carolers.
Gimme a Break!, Nell Harper (Nell Carter) is the daughter of a Baptist minister.
Golden Girls, Blanche Deveraux (Rue McClanahan) is a Southern Baptist
The Grady Nutt Show, Rev. Grady Williams (Grady Nutt), a minister in a short-lived sitcom on NBC who balances family and ministry as he does in the pilot episode where he must preach the funeral of a disliked man while coming to terms with teenage daughter's dating.
LA Law, Jane Halliday (Alexandra Powers), fundamentalist Baptist and attorney, alumna of Bob Jones University. Introduced to the series in the eighth season premiere, when she revealed she intended to remain a virgin until her wedding night.
The Waltons, almost all principal characters were Baptists or attended the Baptist church. In the fourth-season episode "The Sermon", Rev. Matthew Fordwick (John Ritter) asks John Boy (Richard Thomas) to deliver a sermon while he goes on honeymoon. In the fifth-season episode "The Baptism", John Walton, Sr. (Ralph Waite) refuses to attend a tent revival or be baptized.
Young Sheldon, young Sheldon Cooper, raised a Baptist, lacks a belief in God. In the 2019 episode "Albert Einstein and the Story of Another Mary", he considers converting to Judaism to emulate famous scientists like Albert Einstein, but abandons this, telling his parents he will remain "the atheist Baptist you know and love."

See also
List of Christian theologians
List of preachers
List of Southern Baptist Convention affiliated people

References

External links
Christian Hall of Fame
Famous Baptists

 
Baptists